Saksay (Säksäy) is a rural locality (a village) in Temyasovsky Selsoviet, Baymaksky District, Bashkortostan, Russia. The population was 18 as of 2010. There are 2 streets.

Geography 
Saksay is located 64 km north of Baymak (the district's administrative centre) by road. Temyasovo and Beterya are the nearest rural localities.

References 

Rural localities in Baymaksky District